The 1988 WTA Brasil Open (also called the Rainha Cup) was a women's tennis tournament played on outdoor hard courts in Guarujá in Brazil and was part of the Category 1 tier of the 1988 WTA Tour. The tournament ran from 7 November through 13 November 1988. Third-seeded Mercedes Paz won the singles title.

Finals

Singles

 Mercedes Paz defeated  Rene Simpson 7–5, 6–2
 It was Paz's 1st singles title of the year and the 2nd of her career.

Doubles

 Bettina Fulco /  Mercedes Paz defeated  Carin Bakkum /  Simone Schilder 6–3, 6–4
 It was Fulco's only title of the year and the 1st of her career. It was Paz's 4th title of the year and the 12th of her career.

References

External links
 Women's Tennis Association (WTA) tournament edition details
 International Tennis Federation (ITF) tournament edition details

Rainha Cup
Brasil Open
1988 in Brazilian tennis